Peter Craig Sesselmann (born 5 December 1964) aka Peterman is an Australian guitarist, instrument maker, luthier and artist.

Early life
Sesselmann was born in Sydney on 5 December 1964. At the age of two, his family moved to Norway and, after 14 years, they returned to Australia in 1981. His father is German-Australian and his mother is Norwegian.

Career
After many different careers, Sesselmann settled on the family tradition of painting.  Since 2000 he has had several successful exhibitions and has been featured in newspapers and magazines.  He has produced many murals in Kurri Kurri, Cessnock and Patterson. Sesselmann has entered work for the Archibald Prize including his fourth entry, Rock and Role Model (2009) for his portrait of rock music drummer, Craig Rosevear; and Kevin Borich 2013 (2013) for his portrait of rock singer-guitarist, Kevin Borich.

Sesselmann is better known as Peterman or Peterman Acoustic which is his range of hand made instruments and microphones including the "GRIT" microphone range.

Personal life
Sesselmann is divorced and has two children.

Discography
 Fufu Live Underground
 Platform 2
 Mixed Nut

References

External links
 

1964 births
Living people
Australian people of Norwegian descent
Australian people of German descent
Australian expatriates in Norway
20th-century Australian painters
20th-century Australian male artists
21st-century Australian painters
21st-century male artists
Australian muralists
Australian portrait painters
Australian jazz guitarists
Australian rock guitarists
Australian blues guitarists
Australian male guitarists
Australian musical instrument makers
Male jazz musicians
Australian male painters